Gordon Hurst (9 October 1924 – 1980) was an English footballer who played as a winger in the Football League. He moved from Non League Ramsgate Athletic to Charlton Athletic in 1946 where he stayed until 1957 playing in nearly 400 matches. In 1958 he joined Tunbridge Wells United as player manager and stayed there until 1961.

References
 

1924 births
1980 deaths
English footballers
Footballers from Oldham
People from Oldham
Association football midfielders
Charlton Athletic F.C. players
Ramsgate F.C. players
Oldham Athletic A.F.C. managers
Tunbridge Wells F.C. players
English Football League players
English Football League representative players
English football managers
FA Cup Final players